Berberis muelleri  is a shrub with compound leaves, native to the Mexican State of Nuevo León.

The compound leaves place this species in the group sometimes segregated as the genus Mahonia.

References

muelleri
Endemic flora of Mexico
Flora of Nuevo León